The 1915 Kentucky gubernatorial election was held on November 2, 1915. Democratic nominee Augustus Owsley Stanley defeated Republican nominee Edwin P. Morrow with 49.06% of the vote.

General election

Candidates
Major party candidates
Augustus Owsley Stanley, Democratic
Edwin P. Morrow, Republican

Other candidates
L. L. Pickett, Prohibition
Charles Dobbs, Socialist
Fred J. Drexler, Progressive

Results

References

1915
Kentucky
1915 Kentucky elections